Dasypops is a genus of frog in the family Microhylidae. It is monotypic, being represented by the single species, the Rio Mutum frog (Dasypops schirchi). It is endemic to the coastal plain of Espírito Santo and Bahia states of eastern Brazil.
Its natural habitats are lowland forests, including secondary forests and forest edges.  It is an explosive breeder that breeds in temporary pools.
It is potentially threatened by habitat loss.

References

Microhylidae
Monotypic amphibian genera
Amphibians described in 1924
Endemic fauna of Brazil
Amphibians of Brazil
Taxa named by Alípio de Miranda-Ribeiro
Taxonomy articles created by Polbot